Dry Fork is a stream in Callaway County in the U.S. state of Missouri. It is a tributary of Cedar Creek.

Dry Fork was named for its tendency to run dry.

See also
List of rivers of Missouri

References

Rivers of Callaway County, Missouri
Rivers of Missouri